Thomas Wlaschiha (born 20 June 1973) is a German actor. Internationally, he is known for his roles as Jaqen H'ghar in the second, fifth and sixth seasons of the TV series Game of Thrones, as well as Sebastian Berger in the TV series Crossing Lines. He also appeared in four episodes of Jack Ryan. He plays Dmitri Antonov / "Enzo" in the fourth season of Stranger Things.

Biography 
Wlaschiha was born in Dohna, Bezirk Dresden. When he was 17 years old, shortly after the fall of the Berlin Wall, he travelled to Agawam, Massachusetts, United States, as an exchange student. He remained there for a year, acting in theater and studying English. He also speaks French, Italian and Russian.

Since 1998, he has played mostly supporting roles in numerous German and international TV and film productions. In his first leading role he portrayed Stephan in the 2000 gay milieu study No One Sleeps. 

On stage, Wlaschiha has performed with the Theater Junge Generation (Young Generation) in Dresden from 1996 until 2000, with the Schauspielhaus Zürich in 2002, and with the Schauspiel Frankfurt in 2003.

In August 2011, he was cast as the convict and assassin Jaqen H'ghar in season 2 of the HBO fantasy TV series Game of Thrones, and reprised his role in seasons 5 and 6, starting in 2015. For his performance in Game of Thrones he was nominated for Outstanding Performance by an Ensemble in a Drama Series by the Screen Actors Guild Awards in 2016. From 2013 to 2015, he starred in the crime series Crossing Lines as Kommissar Sebastian Berger, a German police officer.

As a voice actor, Wlaschiha is heard in film dubs, audiobooks and commercials. For some of his international work (e.g., Game of Thrones), Wlaschiha dubs himself in German. He voiced Buzz Lightyear in the German dub of Lightyear.

Baritone Ekkehard Wlaschiha was his uncle.

Filmography

Film

Television

Theatre

References

External links 
 

1973 births
Living people
Audiobook narrators
German male film actors
German people of Czech descent
German male stage actors
German male television actors
German male voice actors
Male Shakespearean actors
People from Bezirk Dresden
People from Dohna
University of Music and Theatre Leipzig alumni
20th-century German male actors
21st-century German male actors